The Reconnaissance Battalion or RECON  ( is a elite reconnaissance battalion in the Royal Thai Marine Corps. It falls under the command of the Royal Thai Marine Division. Considered to be the most powerful combat unit of the Royal Thai Marine in 3D combat contain of land, water, air as a Marines special operations forces.

History
On February 24, 1942, the Navy established "Marine Regiment" is directly at the Sattahip Naval Station. The rate of organization consists of a division which consists of an artillery company, 2 infantry battalions, 1 and 2 marines with 2 battalions, 1 small artillery and a heavy machine gun. In addition, there is another support force. The company used reconnaissance horses. The Engineer Company Squadron was commissioned by the military commander, Kham Hiran (rank at that time) as the commander in 1955. 

After the Indochina-France dispute was completed, the Navy improved and organized the Marine Corps. There is an affiliation unit The 2 infantry battalions are the 1st Marine Battalion and the 2nd Marine Battalion. There are 2 battalions of artillery, 1 heavy machine battalion, 1 artillery battalion, which is the 4th Marine Battalion with 1 artillery regiment. (Using mountain artillery) and 2 75 mm artillery battalion 40 calibers (Bofors like the army) are also available 1 combat vehicle squadron (equivalent to the battalion) divided into 4 companies using 20 mm and 37 mm anti-tank guns and 50 mm grenade launchers and 3 more units equivalent to the company Is the mechanic division, communication division and patrol division which is a direct unit to Marines

In 1965 the Royal Thai Marine Corps formed a reconnaissance company with the mission of conducting ground and amphibious reconnaissance and special operations. On 27
November 1978, the company was expanded into the Recon Battalion. The battalion currently consists of one headquarters company with an attached platoon of wardogs, one amphibious reconnaissance company, and two V-I50 patrol vehicle companies. The unit is headed by an RTMC lieutenant-colonel and is based at Sattahip.

A handful of Marine Recon members saw combat when sent to Laos as part ofvolunteer Bn. Cdo. 61g which fought on the Plain of Jars in 1972. As a unit, companies from the battalion are assigned to the RTMC regiments as needed.

Since 1975, Thai Marines have been assigned to Narathiwat as Force Reconnaissance Battalion. In 1977, they captured the communist camp at Krung-Ching in Nakhon Si Thammarat Province, and remaining there until 1981. In December 1978, recon teams were sent to the Mekong River during skirmishes with the Pathet Lao, a communist political movement and organisation in Laos.

Thai Marine Recon anti-terrorist team In 1988. One company was attached in 1989 to an RTMC Task Force at Chanthaburi for operations along the Thai-Cambodian border. Recon personnel are airborne-qualified at the RTMC parachute school at Sattahip; eight jumps are made, including one night and two water jumps. Recon personnel must also attend the three-month amphibious reconnaissance
course at Sattahip covering land and sea tactics.

On February 13, 2013, the Battle of Bacho occurred when 50 RKK members attacked a 2nd Rifle Company, 32nd Task Force Narathiwat of the royal thai marine base. The royal thai marine base had already prepared due to receiving clues about the plans to attack the stronghold 2–3 days before. The marine commander has put in a defensive strategy with additional of the 11 members of Recon and 17 Thai Navy SEALs. After clashing resulted in 16 deaths from attacker side with non fatality for both Recon and Navy SEALs member.

Organization
 Reconnaissance Battalion Headquarter
 1st Amphibious Reconnaissance Company
 2nd Amphibious Reconnaissance Company
 Long-range Reconnaissance Patrol Company
 Service Support Company
 Marine Working Dog Platoon (Explosive and Drug Detection Dog)

Mission and training
The mission of Reconnaissance Battalion is to provide task organized forces in order to conduct amphibious reconnaissance, ground reconnaissance, battlespace shaping operations, raids, and specialized insertion and extraction.

Training

The Recon program trains its students to lead amphibious assaults and operate far from ally support. Therefore, a higher degree of competency and leadership is required.

The Reconnaissance Battalion operators are trained to operate in the sea, on the ground, and in the air, hence the unusual nickname of '3D warrior'. The Recon training program is reputed to be among the most difficult of Thai military special operations forces. There is a common quote that "the SEALS have a Hell Week, but it's Hell EVERY Week in the RECON." (ซีลมีสัปดาห์นรก แต่รีคอนนรกทุกสัปดาห์)

Applicants to the program must be active members of the Navy (or other services or the Police, based on quota and invitation) with an age limit of 35.

The course is 13 weeks long, divided into 5 weeks for base mission, 4 weeks of maritime mission (including paddling resistant rubber 15 nautical miles or 27 kilometers, carrying resistant rubber boats for about 10 kilometers without breaks and swim 5 nautical miles or 9.6 kilometers), and the last 4 weeks in jungle and mountain region.

The instructors will present tasks that must be solved by the students, further increasing the difficulty of the training program by adding mental elements to the already physically demanding training.

There is also a "Prisoner of War" situation which simulates capture by the enemy. The final mission is a 72-hour problem that Recon special combat students must perform without rest for 3 days and 3 nights.

Graduates of the Recon training program are entitled to wear the Recon badge, regardless of his/her branch. As stated, Recon is one of the most difficult special operations training courses available to Thai servicemembers, ranking above other badges such as the Queen's Musketeers, SEAL, or the Rangers. This makes Recon one of the most sought-after among the "wing hunters" (servicemembers purposefully aiming to complete multiple special operations training programs) around the country.

Equipments

Engagements
Cold War
 Communist insurgency in Thailand
 Communist insurgency in Malaysia
 Vietnamese border raids in Thailand
Southern Insurgency
 Battle of Bacho (2013)

See also
 Royal Thai Special Force
 Royal Thai Navy SEALs
 Royal Thai Air Force Security Force Regiment
 Royal Thai Air Force Commando
 Royal Thai Marine Corps
 Border Patrol Police
 United States Marine Corps
 Marine Force Recon

Cited books

References

Military units and formations of Thailand
Military units and formations established in 1941